Oenochlora is a monotypic moth genus in the family Geometridae. Its sole species is Oenochlora imperialis, which is known from Australia. Both the genus and species were first described by Warren in 1896.

References

Geometrinae
Moths of Australia
Monotypic moth genera